The Lorax is a children's book by Dr. Seuss.

Lorax or LORAX may also refer to:

 The Lorax (TV special), a 1972 TV animated short based on the book
 The Lorax (film), a 2012 animated film based on the book
 The Lorax (soundtrack), the soundtrack from the 2012 film
 The Lorax (play), a 2015 stage adaptation of the book
 LORAX, a robotics project of Carnegie Mellon University
 Lori Black (born 1954), American musician, also known as Lorax